George Oyebode Oyedepo (born 20 September 1985) is a Nigerian professional footballer who currently plays as a forward for Persiba Bantul in the Indonesia Super League.

Career
He played for PSS Sleman and Kalteng Putra before joining Persiba Bantul.

References

External links
 
 Player profil at goal.com
 Player profil at ligaindonesia.co.id

1985 births
Living people
Nigerian footballers
Persiba Bantul players
PSS Sleman players
Nigerian expatriate footballers
Nigerian expatriate sportspeople in Indonesia
Expatriate footballers in Indonesia
Liga 1 (Indonesia) players
Indonesian Premier Division players
Association football forwards